Edusat or EDUSAT may refer to:

 GSAT-3, an Indian communications satellite which is also known as EDUSAT
 EduSAT, an Italian microsatellite
 Edusat, an educational television network in Mexico
 EduSat, an educational television channel in Poland